Demons of the Burning Night is a 1989 role-playing game supplement for Rolemaster published by Iron Crown Enterprises.

Contents
Demons of the Burning Night is a supplement in which the setting is the demon city Tarak Nev.

Publication history
Demons of the Burning Night was written by Matthew Power, with a cover by Tony Roberts, and illustrations by Jennell Jaquays, and was published by Iron Crown Enterprises in 1989 as a 72-page book.

Reception
Oliver Johnson reviewed Demons of the Burning Night for Games International magazine, and gave it 2 1/2 stars out of 5, and stated that "All in all rather disappointing. Too much of the adventuring involves ability rolls rather than genuine role-playing and clues that the gamers can figure out for themselves. Friendly non player characters are clichéd and creatures are a dull rag bag."

Notes

References

Role-playing game supplements introduced in 1989
Rolemaster supplements
Shadow World (role-playing game)